Operation Saratoga was a search and destroy operation during the Vietnam War conducted by the 2nd Brigade, 25th Infantry Division that took place in northeastern Hậu Nghĩa, southern Tây Ninh and western Bình Dương Provinces, lasting from 8 December 1967 to 11 March 1968. During this period the Tet Offensive took place and US forces were used for the defense of Saigon.

Background
The purpose of the operation was to conduct combined operations with the Army of the Republic of Vietnam (ARVN) 5th and 25th Divisions to neutralize Vietcong (VC) bases in the Filhol Plantation and the Ho Bo Woods, control resources and prevent VC rice taxation.

Operation

1967
The operation commenced on 8 December with the 1st Battalion, 27th Infantry Regiment landed in the Ho Bo Woods and the Filhol Plantation to secure the area for a Rome plow sweep to clear more than 5,250 acres of land. The battalion encountered no serious resistance. That same day, the 4th Battalion, 23rd Infantry Regiment, escorted the division engineers and their plows out of the Iron Triangle and back across the Saigon River via barges, reaching Cu Chi Base Camp without incident.  On 11 December 1/27th Infantry conducted an air assault and a supporting gunship was shot down, they later overran a VC bunker position killing 9 VC for 1 US killed and later killed another VC and captured 1 while gunships killed another VC.  On 12 December, the People’s Army of Vietnam (PAVN) 1st Battalion, 101st Regiment, attacked the 1/27th Infantry as it was setting up a night defense position in the Filhol Plantation. They repulsed the assault with help from artillery crews based at Cu Chi, twelve kilometers to the south, killing 39 PAVN. On 14 December 4/23rd Infantry lost 2 killed by small arms fire and booby-traps. 

After several days passed without further sign of the 101st, General Mearns decided to put Saratoga on hold so he could launch a new operation known as ‘’’Operation Camden’’’ to trap the PAVN 101st Regiment. On 17 December, the 1st and 2d Battalions, 27th Infantry, and several companies from the 2nd Battalion, 34th Armor Regiment, began a sweep through the Ho Bo and Boi Loi Woods. The 3rd Brigade established a blocking force along the eastern side of the Saigon River to prevent the PAVN regiment from escaping into the Trapezoid base area located just north of the Iron Triangle. Two battalions from the ARVN 49th Regiment, 25th Division, also joined the operation. The first major contact occurred on 21 December when a battalion-size VC force ambushed Company A, 2/27th Infantry and several M48 tanks that were searching the Ho Bo Woods. The Americans sustained four killed, while also losing two tanks destroyed, while VC losses were 42 killed. The next day on the eastern side of the river, the 3rd Battalion, 22nd Infantry Regiment found the 101st Regiment while combing through the Trapezoid, stumbling onto a pair of bunker complexes manned by PAVN soldiers, resulting in an all-day fight that left 14 US dead. The PAVN withdrew during the night, carrying away all but 3 dead. General Mearns spent another week searching for the 101st, finally terminating Operation Camden on 31 December. During the operation, the US/ARVN had killed over 100 PAVN/VC, captured 29 detainees and 19 tons of rice, and destroyed another 35 tons of rice that could not be easily relocated. 

All of the attention devoted to degrading the PAVN/VC main forces and bases along the Saigon River corridor in November and December necessarily pulled troops away from maintaining Hậu Nghĩa’s day-to-day security. Usually the 2nd Brigade could muster only one battalion for security duties, and sometimes none. The ARVN had also removed 2 battalions from Hậu Nghĩa and sent them to Tây Ninh Province to participate in Operation Yellowstone. When US troops were available, they performed ground patrols, small airmobile raids, search-and-destroy operations, and hamlet cordon-and-search actions. One of the hamlet searches, conducted by the 2/27th Infantry, and Vietnamese police on 16 December apprehended 100 VC suspects. Forty Kit Carson Scouts assisted in most of these operations. Meanwhile, the Division’s military police continued to perform resource control operations with their South Vietnamese counterparts, netting 100,000 piasters worth of contraband, almost a kilogram of marijuana, and fifty-three deserters and draft dodgers in December. The brigade’s training and civic action activities likewise continued unabated, while the Combined Reconnaissance and Intelligence Platoon (CRIP) vigorously harried the VC. By year’s end, the platoon had killed 92 VC, captured 36, and destroyed twenty tunnels since its formation in the spring. 

Reports of PAVN/VC troop movements began to filter into allied intelligence centers during the final days of 1967. The focal point of these movements was the VC-dominated Đức Huệ District and the Vàm Cỏ Đông River. Several small clashes occurred during the last weeks of December that indicated that the VC intend to attack the provincial capital. On the night of 12 December, the VC lobbed 35 mortar shells into the city, while a platoon unsuccessfully attacked a Popular Forces post north of town. Two weeks later, a CRIP patrol located fifty VC outside Bao Trai and dispersed them by calling in artillery. Far more serious than these skirmishes were indications that the VC in Hau Nghia were refitting both their local forces and the guerrillas with AK-47 assault rifles, weapons that would give them a significant advantage in any firefight with government forces.

1968
On 1 January Company C, 1/27th Infantry engaged a VC force killing 3 and later that day Company D engaged 6 VC killing 2. On 4 January Company C, 1/27th Infantry killed 1 VC while supporting gunships killed 5 VC. Later that day Companies B and C lost 6 US killed by small arms fire, Company B attacked a VC position killing 2 VC and Company A lost 1 killed by sniper fire and killed 3 VC. Company A later lost several killed in a friendly fire incident while Companies C and D each lost 1 killed by small arms fire. On 5 January gunships and aircraft supporting 1/27th Infantry killed 10 VC. Later that day Company B, 1/27th Infantry found 10 VC graves, while 2/27th Infantry found numerous VC graves and dead. On 6 January 1/27th Infantry found 10 VC graves/dead while 2/27th Infantry found 5 VC dead.

On 8 January Company C, 1/27th Infantry engaged 9 VC killing 1 and later found 2 VC killed by artillery fire. A 4/23rd Infantry M113 armored personnel carrier hit a land mine destroying the vehicle. On 9 January 1/27th Infantry engaged 3 VC killing 1. On 10 January 1/27th Infantry’s night defensive position was attacked resulting in 5 US killed, artillery and air support was called in killing 33 VC with 1 captured. Gunships killed 2 VC and captured 1 and Companies C and D found 30 VC dead. Later that day gunships killed a further 4 VC and Company D killed 1. The same day gunships supporting 2/27th Infantry found 23 VC graves and one gunship was shot down. On 11 January Company B, 2/27th Infantry killed 5 VC and captured 2. On 12 January gunships supporting 1/27th Infantry killed 2 VC. Gunships and aircraft supporting 2/27th Infantry killed 5 VC while a Company C soldier was killed by sniper fire. On 13 January gunships supporting 2/27th Infantry killed 2 VC and Company C located 9 dead VC. A Rome plow escorted by 4/23rd Infantry received RPG fire and troops responded killing 1 VC.

On 16 January Recon platoon, 1/27th Infantry killed 1 VC, Company C killed 10 VC and supporting gunships killed 4 VC. On 17 January a mortar attack on 1/27th Infantry’s night defensive position killed 7 US and a Company B, 4/23rd Infantry soldier was killed by friendly artillery fire. On 18 January a 4/23rd Infantry M113 was destroyed by a mine and Company D killed 3 VC. On 19 January Company A, 2/34th Armor lost 1 killed by small arms and RPG-2 fire. On 20 January Company D, 1/27th Infantry killed 1 VC while losing 2 killed and a Company A, 4/23rd Infantry M113 was destroyed by a mine. On 21 January Company A, 2/27th Infantry found 3 VC graves, while Companies A and C, 4/23rd Infantry engaged a VC force killing 30 for the loss of 3 US killed.

On 22 January gunships supporting 2/27th Infantry killed 3 VC. Company A killed 2 VC, Company B killed 2 VC and found 1 grave, Company D killed 3 VC and found 5 graves and gunships killed a further 3 VC. On 23 January a Company C, 4/23rd Infantry M113 was destroyed by a mine and numerous mines caused minor damage to Rome plows. On 24 January 1/27th Infantry units found a VC base camp area, while Company B, 2/27th Infantry found 5000lbs of rice. Companies B and D, 4/23rd came under small arms and RPG fire losing 3 killed and 2 M113s destroyed, Company C later located graves containing 38 VC and a Company A M113 hit a mine killing 1 US. On 25 January gunships supporting 1/27th Infantry killed a VC on a sampan. Rome plows detonated numerous antitank mines and Company A, 4/23rd killed 2 VC. On 26 January 2/27th Infantry killed several VC while supporting gunships killed 2. Gunships supporting 4/23rd Infantry killed 2 VC, Rome plows detonated numerous antitank mines and 1 M113 was destroyed and helicopters and artillery killed 6 VC. On 27 January a UH-1 supporting 2/27th Infantry crashed and was destroyed and another was damaged by crash debris and forces to land and Company D found 1 dead VC. 4/23rd Infantry Rome plows hit 3 mines with minimal damage. 3rd Battalion, 22nd Infantry Regiment received small arms fire resulting in 1 dead, battalion companies killed 7 VC and found 3 graves and had a further 2 US killed while supporting gunships killed 3 VC. On 28 January a 1/27th Infantry unit detonated a dud artillery round killing 2 soldiers. Company C found several VC killed by gunships and Company C, 3/22nd Infantry found 1 dead VC and supporting artillery destroyed a sampan killing 2 VC. On 29 January 4/23rd Infantry Rome plows detonated numerous mines resulting in minimal damage. 3/22nd Infantry received heavy small arms fire killing 1 US and returned fire killing 5 VC and supporting gunships killed 5 VC. 

At the start of the Tet Offensive on 30 January 2/27th Infantry conducted a night airmobile assault to support Troop D, 3rd Battalion, 4th Cavalry Regiment, gunships killed 25 VC and in a sweep of the perimeter found 43 dead VC were found and 1 captured. 4/23rd Infantry found VC hiding in tunnels killing 2 and capturing 6. 3/22nd Infantry found 3 dead VC and killed 1. On 31 January Company B, 1/27th Infantry engaged a VC force losing 2 killed and in a later engagement killed 22 VC and captured a 75mm recoilless rifle and 4 weapons. 1/27th Infantry later conducted an airmobile assault to support ARVN units heavily engaged at Hóc Môn District and the battalion was placed under the operation control of II Field Force, Vietnam. 2/27th Infantry conducted an airmobile assault to support the 3/4th Cavalry moving towards Saigon to counter the attack on Tan Son Nhut Air Base and was placed under the operation control of the Capital Military District. 4/23rd Infantry and 3/22nd Infantry moved to secure Cu Chi Base Camp and the surrounding area.

On 1 February 3/22nd Infantry undertook operations to reopen the roads around Cu Chi killing 11 VC and capturing 2. On 2 February 4/23rd Infantry found 6 VC dead and captured 7 weapons, Company B killed 2 VC, Companies B and C were attacked by VC resulting in 1 US and 5 Vc killed and mortar attacks on Cu Chi Base Camp killed 1 US. On 3 February 2nd Battalion, 12th Infantry Regiment engaged 2 groups of VC killing 7 and a supporting gunship was downed by small arms fire. 3/22nd Infantry destroyed an ambush site on Highway 1, following a mortar attack Company A killed 13 VC. 4/23rd Infantry linked up with 3/22nd Infantry to clear Highway 1 and then searched for VC rocket sites, losing 3 M113s destroyed in combat with VC. 

On 5 February 2/12th Infantry conducted airmobile assaults engaging 2 groups of VC losing 4 dead and killing 27 VC, while gunships and airstrikes killed a further 34. On 6 February the CRIP was engaged by VC suffering 10 wounded while VC losses were unknown. 2/12th Infantry conducted airmobile assaults and were engaged by VC killing 9 VC while airstrikes and artillery killed 6 VC. Companies C and D, 3/22nd Infantry on a road-sweeping mission were attacked by VC losing 5 killed. On 7 February Company C, 3/22nd Infantry lost 2 killed to small arms fire and Company A lost 1 killed. On 8 February Company C, 2/12th Infantry killed 3 VC with Claymore mines, Company B captured 5 VC and Company D was attacked by VC resulting in 1 US killed and 22 VC killed. 3/22nd Infantry found 30 VC dead. On 9 February Company C, 2/12th Infantry on a road security operation received VC fire losing 1 killed, they returned fire and in the subsequent battle killed 8 VC for a further 2 US killed and in two further contacts Companies A and B lost 6 killed. 3/22nd Infantry killed 23 VC. On 10 February 2/12th Infantry had numerous contacts with VC killing a total of 14. 3/22nd Infantry also had multiple skirmishes resulting in 4 US killed. On 11 February Company A, 2/12th Infantry was attacked by VC resulting in 1 US killed and 10 VC killed.

On 12 February 2/12th Infantry engaged several groups of VC losing 1 killed. Companies C and D 3/22nd Infantry cleared a VC bunker complex supported by armor losing 4 killed. On 13 February 2/12th Infantry has 2 US killed in 2 separate engagements, 3/22nd Infantry also had 2 skirmishes, 4/23rd Infantry was engaged by an entrenched VC force with 4 US killed and 3 M113s destroyed in the battle and airstrikes killed 5 VC. On 14 February 2/12th Infantry found 46 VC dead, 3/22nd Infantry killed 10 VC, 4/23rd Infantry overran the remaining VC positions killing 91 VC for the loss of 10 US killed and airstrikes and helicopters killed a further 7 VC. On 15 February 2/12th Infantry found 36 VC dead and 3/22nd Infantry killed 22 VC. On 16 February 2/12th Infantry skirmished twice with VC, 3/22nd Infantry killed 3 VC and found 25 VC dead. On 17 February 1st Battalion (Mechanized), 5th Infantry Regiment killed 4 VC, 1/27th Infantry recovered the bodies of 2 missing soldiers, 3/22nd Infantry found 10 VC dead and airstrikes killed 1 VC and airstrikes killed 1 VC. On 18 February 1/5th Infantry was attacked by 2 VC companies and returned fire killing 7, a mortar attack on 1/5th night defensive position killed 1 US. 1/27th Infantry located 2 VC graves, Company D, 2/27th Infantry found 21 VC graves, L Troop, 11th Armored Cavalry Regiment was attacked by VC and returned fire killing 24 and gunships killed 8 VC.

On 19 February 1/5th Infantry killed 1 VC, Company D, 1/27th Infantry killed 1 VC, Company B, 2/27th Infantry killed 5 VC, Company B, 3/22nd Infantry came under fire losing 3 killed and a Company A convoy was fired on and they killed 1 VC. On 20 February Company C, 1/27th Infantry killed 1 VC and Company D killed 1 VC and Company D, 3/22nd Infantry received fire and killed 5 VC. On 21 February Recon platoon, 1/27th Infantry killed 1 VC, a medevac helicopter was downed by small-arms fire and a company soldier was killed in a skirmish with 3-5 VC. Company C, 2/27th Infantry found 2 VC dead and then killed 1 VC. On 22 February a Forward air controller (FAC) supporting 1/5th Infantry directed a Napalm strike killing 1 VC and Company C killed 2 VC. Company C, 1/27th Infantry received fire killing 3 US and then killed 1 VC and found 5 VC dead, Company D tripped a booby-trap killing 1 US and Company C found another VC dead. Company D, 2/27th Infantry killed 2 VC, gunships killed 2 VC, Company D found 19 VC dead, gunships killed 1 VC and Company C found 4 VC graves. In 3 separate skirmishes 3/22nd Infantry killed 3 VC. On 23 February 1/27th Infantry found 6 VC dead, 2/27th Infantry killed 4 VC in 5 skirmishes and found 4 VC dead. Company B, 3/22nd Infantry received small arms fire killing 1 US and Company D found 7 VC dead. On 24 February Company C, 1/27th Infantry received fire and responded killing 5 VC, Company A killed 2 VC and Company D engaged 7 VC with unknown results. Company C, 3/22nd Infantry received automatic weapons fire killing 1 US and then killed 1 VC. On 25 February Company B, 2/27th Infantry killed 2 VC, Company C received firing killing 3 US and returned fire killing 2 VC and the Brigade command & control helicopter killed 2 VC. Company D, 3/22nd Infantry found 21 VC dead and then came under fire and killed 8 VC. 4th Battalion, 9th Infantry Regiment joined the operation and Companies B and C received fire killing 3 US.

On 26 February Company B, 2/27th Infantry killed 2 VC, Company D received fire killing 3 US and returned fire killing 1 VC and 3 M113s were hit by RPGs killing 2 US and destroying all 3 M113s. Company B, 4/9th Infantry received fire killing 1 US and returned fire killing 2 VC and later that day the Battalion was attacked by VC killing 1 US and they returned fire killing 12 VC.  On 27 February Company D, 2/27th Infantry received fire and killed 12 VC while supporting gunships killed a further 3. Company A, 4/9th infantry killed 2 VC, Company A killed 2 VC, Company C killed 5 VC in bunkers, found 1 VC dead and killed a further 3 VC and Company B found 4 VC graves. 2/34th Armor and Company C, 1/5th infantry killed 12 VC in 3 separate engagements. On 28 February 1/5th Infantry found 7 VC dead, 2/27th Infantry found 7 VC dead, 3/22nd Infantry found 3 VC dead and 4/9th Infantry found 1 VC dead. 2/34th Armor’s night defensive position received mortar fire killing 1 US and later small arms and RPG fire killed another US, the units returned fire killing 1 VC and capturing 3. On 29 February gunships supporting 2/27th Infantry killed 1 VC, a FAC killed 1 VC, Company C found 1 VC dead, gunships killed 3 VC and Companies C and D engaged the VC in 3 other skirmishes. Company A, 3/22nd Infantry received sniper fire and capture 1 VC and Company D found 1 VC dead. The Brigade command and control helicopter killed 3 VC and FACs directed fire killing 12 VC.

On 1 March Company A, 1/5th Infantry found 3 VC dead, Company B, 2/27th Infantry killed 4 VC. 3/22nd Infantry killed several VC and Company A killed 14 VC. Company B, 4/9th Infantry killed 1 VC, Company B found 1 VC dead, Company A found 2 VC dead, Company B found 1 VC dead and later received small arms fire losing 2 killed. On 2 March 2/34th Armor and Company C, 1/5th Infantry killed 2 VC, found 15 VC graves and captured 4 VC. On 3 March 2/27th Infantry killed 3 VC, Company A, 3/22nd killed 7 VC and found 1 grave, Company B found 12 VC graves and killed 1 VC and Company C found 7 VC graves. 4/9th Infantry found 3 dead VC and were engaged by VC killing 11.

On 4 March Company A, 2/27th Infantry engaged a sampan killing 4 VC, Company D, 3/22nd Infantry found 6 VC graves, Company D, 4/9th killed 1 VC, Company A and gunships killed 3 VC and 2/34th Armor found 1 VC grave. On 5 March 2/27th Infantry found 13 VC dead, 3/22nd Infantry found 9 VC dead, 4/9th Infantry found 14 VC dead, 2/34th Armor killed 3 VC and the Brigade command and control helicopter killed 2 VC. On 6 March Company D, 3/22nd Infantry received firing killing 1 US, Company B, 4/9th Infantry received fire and killed 1 VC and 2/34th Armor captured 4 VC and found 1 dead. On 7 March Company C, 2/27th Infantry found 4 VC dead, Company C, 3/22nd Infantry received fire killing 2 US, Company B, 4/9th Infantry received sniper fire and killed 1 VC, Company D killed 1 VC, Company A received fire killing 1 US and later received fire and killed 3 VC and Company C, 1/5th Infantry found 18 VC graves. On 8 March Company D, 4/9th Infantry found 2 VC dead and later killed 2 VC. On 10 March 1/27th Infantry’s night defensive position received mortar fire killing 1 US, gunships attacked a VC platoon killing 2 VC and then a further 3 VC, gunships killed another 6 VC that afternoon, Companies C and D received heavy fire killing 1 US and gunships killed another 4 VC. 2/27th Infantry received several attacks by fire and killed 1 VC sniper and airstrikes killed 4 VC.

Aftermath
The operation was suspended on 11 March 1968 by General Frederick C. Weyand, commander of II Field Force, Vietnam so that the forces could be dedicated to Operation Quyet Thang. VC losses were 2043 killed and 139 captured for US losses of 275 killed.

References

Conflicts in 1967
Conflicts in 1968
Saratoga
Battles and operations of the Vietnam War in 1967
Battles and operations of the Vietnam War in 1968
History of Bình Dương province
History of Long An Province
History of Tây Ninh Province